Amy Elizabeth Duggan (born 11 June 1979) is an Australian retired association football player and media personality.

Football career
Amy Taylor was born in Canberra, Australia and grew up in Tuggeranong. She started playing soccer at Tuggeranong United FC. At club level, she played nearly 100 games for the Canberra Eclipse in the now defunct Australian Women's National Soccer League, and played professionally for Hampton Roads Piranhas in the USL W-League.

She was a member of the Australia women's national soccer team, known as "The Matildas", playing as a defender in over thirty international matches. She was first selected to the Australian women's national team in 1997, at the age of 17—just six years after she began playing the sport. That same year she was called up for the 1997 Women's U.S. Cup to replace injured defender Bridgette Starr, scoring her first international goal as the Matildas lost 9–1 to the United States. Taylor was an unused substitute during the 1999 FIFA Women's World Cup, and that same year she appeared on the cover of nude calendar featuring current Matilda's players, designed to lift the profile of the women's game and raise funds to support the national team's activities. She wound up cut out of the Australian team for the 2000 Summer Olympics.

After one year away from international soccer, Taylor returned to the Matildas in 2004 to take part in the Olympic qualifiers. She was again an alternate player for the 2004 Olympics tournament.

Known as a tenacious defender and aggressive tackler.  Taylor's succumbed to a number of ankle injuries undergoing two reconstructive surgeries. She retired from international football in 2005 to take on a career in the media full time.

2000 Matildas Calendar and Magazine Appearances

In 1999–2000, she starred nude in the Matildas Football Calendar  She also starred in a bikini in several Inside Sport Magazines including as the Covergirl of the August 2000 Inside Sport Magazine. Amy Taylor also starred in the March 2001 Issue of the Australian Ralph Magazine. She also received an offer to star naked in Zoo Weekly Magazine.

Media career
Her appearance on the Matilda's calendar led to appearances in various magazines and print ads as a model. She joined WIN Television in Australia as a presenter on a fishing program called Fishing Australia. She became the sports presenter for WIN News, becoming one of WIN's most popular personalities.

In 2008, Duggan co-hosted the first series of football-reality television program Football Superstar on pay TV channel FOX8. For the second series in 2009, she was replaced by Lee Furlong after the birth of her first child.

While continuing her role on WIN News, she has also hosted and commentated for ABC's telecast of the W-League national women's competition. Then went on to Host W-League and Matilda's matches for Fox Sports from 2015 to 2018 before signing with Optus Sport in 2019 for the 2019 Women's World Cup.

From August 2016, Amy started hosting a 4-hour music program on Wollongong's i98FM, called Chilled Sundays.

Personal life
Amy is married to Matt Duggan, and has three children.

References

External links
WIN Television Presenter Profile

1979 births
Living people
1999 FIFA Women's World Cup players
Footballers at the 2004 Summer Olympics
Olympic soccer players of Australia
Australian women's soccer players
Australia women's international soccer players
WIN News presenters
Sportspeople from Canberra
Soccer players from the Australian Capital Territory
Women's association football defenders
ACT Academy of Sport alumni
Australian women television journalists
Hampton Roads Piranhas players